The Stooge is a 1952 American comedy film directed by Norman Taurog and starring the comedy team of Martin and Lewis.  The film was released nationally in the United States in February 1953 by Paramount Pictures.

Plot
In 1930, entertainer Bill Miller believes that he has the ability to become a solo performer.  He and his partner Ben Bailey split up and go their separate ways.  Miller fails miserably, and his manager Leo Lyman thinks it would be a good idea to perform with a "stooge."  Enter Ted Rogers, who plays an accident-prone foil for Miller.  Soon afterwards, Miller's act is a hit.

Along the way, Rogers is unaware that he is the real reason the act is a success and becomes very loyal to Miller.  Even though he receives no billing, he defends his "partner" when others suggest he is being taken advantage of by Miller.

Eventually, even Miller's wife Mary is ashamed of his treatment of Rogers, going so far as to threaten him with divorce.  Miller is more determined than ever to prove he can make it as a single and fires Rogers, but promptly regrets his decision as his first performance as a true solo artist flops.  He addresses the audience, apologizing and admitting that the "stooge" was the true heart and soul of the act.  Rogers, who is sitting in the audience, comes to his rescue by joining him onstage and the two finally become true partners.

Cast
Dean Martin as Bill Miller
Jerry Lewis as Theodore 'Ted' Rogers
Polly Bergen as Mary Turner
Marion Marshall as Genevieve 'Frecklehead' Tait
Eddie Mayehoff as Leo Lyman
Richard Erdman as Ben Bailey
Frances Bavier as Mrs. Rogers

Production
The Stooge was filmed between February 19 and March 24, 1951, and although it was filmed before two other Martin and Lewis films, Sailor Beware and Jumping Jacks, this film was withheld from distribution by Paramount because they were concerned about the audience's reaction to the way Martin treated Lewis in the movie. Lewis has stated that this is his favorite Martin and Lewis film.

Home media
The Stooge has been released four times on DVD.  It was originally released on October 12, 2004.  Two years later it was included on an eight-film DVD set, the Dean Martin and Jerry Lewis Collection: Volume One, released on October 31, 2006. In June 2018, it was released as part of a 10 film collection of Jerry Lewis films on DVD, and again on March 15, 2021.

On November 10, 2020, it was released on Blu-ray by Paramount.

In other media

Comic books
 Eastern Color Movie Love #13 (February 1952)

References

External links
 
 
 
  

1952 films
1952 comedy films
American comedy films
American black-and-white films
1950s English-language films
Films directed by Norman Taurog
Films produced by Hal B. Wallis
Paramount Pictures films
Films adapted into comics
1950s American films